Annaclone is a village and civil parish between Rathfriland and Banbridge in south County Down, Northern Ireland, about 7 km south-east of Banbridge. The village is situated in the townlands of Ardbrin and Tullintanvally and both it and the civil parish are located in the historic barony of Iveagh Upper, Upper Half. It had a population of 150 people (61 households) in the 2011 Census.

The geography of Annaclone is typical of much of the area around the Mourne Mountains with rolling drumlins and farmland. Corbet Lough is a particular place of interest for anglers while the highest point of the parish, locally known as 'the Knock' offers panoramic views of the Mourne Mountains towards the south and Slieve Croob towards the north east.

History
The marsh in the Ardbrin area of Annaclone is of particular historical interest and several Celtic artefacts were found in it, including a horn known as the 'Ardbrin Horn' which now resides in the National Museum of Ireland, Dublin. Historically the area belonged to the Magennis clan. The remains of their castle are situated in nearby Rathfriland.  Indeed, the aforementioned Celtic artefacts found in the parish cement its link with the ancient clan.

People
Patrick Brontë, father of Charlotte Brontë and Emily Brontë, was born in the parish in 1777 and also taught in a school in the parish. As a result, the area of southern Annaclone is known as 'The Brontë Homeland'. Although Patrick Brontë's house is now in ruins, the nearby Brontë Interpretative Centre maintains the link between the family and the area.
Catherine O'Hare, the first European woman to cross the Canadian Rockies (with her husband Mr. Schubert, and two small children, en route to the Fraser Valley gold rush), was born around 1835 in the townland of Ballybrick in Annaclone.

Sport
The parish has a strong GAA club, Annaclone GAC (Gaelic Athletic Club). Founded in 1897 .  
Annaclone also plays host to a stage of the Circuit of Ireland Rally as well as many cycling events throughout the year.

Civil parish of Annaclone
The civil parish of Annaclone includes the village of Annaclone.

Townlands
The civil parish contains the following townlands:

Ardbrin
Aughnacloy
Ballynafern
Ballynafoy
Ballynagross
Ballynanny
Ballysheil
Cappagh
Clay
Derrylough
Lisnasliggan
Tullintanvally

See also
List of towns and villages in Northern Ireland
List of civil parishes of County Down

References

External links
Annaclone History

 
Villages in County Down